Keyport Harbor is an arm of Raritan Bay, located on the south side of the bay. Streams flowing into Keyport Harbor include Matawan Creek, Luppatatong Creek and Chingarora Creek.

An earlier name for Keyport Harbor is Brown's Point Cove.

References

Bodies of water of Monmouth County, New Jersey
Bays of New Jersey